Ludwikowo  is a settlement in the administrative district of Gmina Zaniemyśl, within Środa Wielkopolska County, Greater Poland Voivodeship, in west-central Poland.

References

Villages in Środa Wielkopolska County